Jan z Jani (Joannes  de Janie in Medieval Latin, Jan von der Jane in German) (1400–1461) - of the Clan of Ostoja was the first Polish Duke of Pomerelia (from 1454 to 1461) and one of the leaders of the Prussian Confederation, serving as a commander in the Thirteen Years' War (1454–66). He was also the Lord of Regality of Tczew, Nowe County and Kiszewskie, Lord of Starogard Gdański, Rabelnaw, Robaw, Pancze, Wonental, Szwarczenwalt, Weisenwalt, Moealwalt, Landesende, Turze, and Lord of Gniew.

Jan z Jani's origin was from a noble family that entered the Clan Ostoja through marriage with the sister of Mikołaj Szarlejski, who was part of the Clan of Ostoja and Duke of Inowrocław and Kujawy, Lord of Bydgoszcz, and member of the Prussian Confederation. Together with Szarlejski, Jan z Jani raised army units in Pomerania during Thirteen Years' War (1454–66) and the conflict with Teutonic Knights. He also cooperated with another member of the Clan of Ostoja, Stibor of Poniec, Lord of Regality of Greater Poland and the renowned diplomat in order to raise funds to attack Malbork, the headquarters of the Teutonic Knights.

A local legend speaks of the mighty knight Jan z Jani who designed a new coat of arms and called it the Ostoja.

See also
Clan of Ostoja
Ostoja coat of arms
Stibor of Stiboricz

References

Further reading
Marian Biskup, Wojny Polski z Zakonem Krzyżackim 1308-1521, Gdańsk 1993.
Tomasz Jurek, Dzieje Średniowieczne, Warszawa, Wydawnictwa Szkolne i Pedagogiczne,  
Karol Górski, Pomorze w dobie wojny trzynastoletniej, Poznan 1932

External links
IHPAN (Polish Academy of Science) - Świerczyn
The legend about Jan z Jani and the Ostoja Coat of arms
Great and known people
Seweryn Uruski, T.5 - von der Jane
Jan z Jani
Digital Library, Karol Górski, Studia i szkice z dziejów Państwa Krzyżackiego, Jan z Jani

1400 births
1461 deaths
Clan of Ostoja
Medieval Polish knights
15th-century Polish nobility